Nicolae Josan (born 18 September 1983) is a Moldovan former footballer.

Career
In March 2015, Josan signed for FC Sakhalin Yuzhno-Sakhalinsk.

Honours
 Russian First Division best midfielder: 2009.

International goals

References

External links
 

1983 births
Living people
Moldovan footballers
Moldovan expatriate footballers
Moldova international footballers
FC KAMAZ Naberezhnye Chelny players
FC Anzhi Makhachkala players
FC Sheriff Tiraspol players
FC Tiraspol players
Russian Premier League players
Expatriate footballers in Russia
Moldovan expatriate sportspeople in Russia
People from Rezina District
FC Veris Chișinău players
FC Sakhalin Yuzhno-Sakhalinsk players
Association football midfielders